Yankee Hill is an unincorporated community and census-designated place in Lancaster County, Nebraska, United States. Its population was 292 as of the 2010 census.

Geography

Education
Its school district is Lincoln Public Schools.

Demographics

References

Unincorporated communities in Lancaster County, Nebraska
Unincorporated communities in Nebraska
Census-designated places in Lancaster County, Nebraska
Census-designated places in Nebraska